Dalmasan, Mt. Dalma, is part of the Taebaek mountain range and lies in Haenam county, South Jeolla province, South Korea.  Its elevation is 489 meters, and its peak offers views of the "Land's Edge," (땅끝) the southernmost point on the Korean peninsula, 땅끝마을, and outlying islands such as Wando.  Also in the vicinity are Mihwangsa and a number of hermitages affiliated with it.

There are many temples although the scale are not that huge. Mihwang temple is one of the best sights which tourists visit. It also has temple stay program for foreigners and Koreans.

See also
List of mountains in Korea

References

External links
달마산과 미황사(KOR) Korea Tourism Organization
Profile from Haenam County official site

Mountains of South Jeolla Province
Haenam County
Mountains of South Korea